Cinelli is an Italian bicycle manufacturer.

Cinelli can also refer to: 
 Antonio Cinelli (b. 1989), Italian football player
 Cino Cinelli (1916–2001), Italian cyclist
 In music scores, cinelli indicates cymbals